Godwin Emefiele (born 4 August 1961) is a Nigerian politician, economist and banker who has served as governor of the Central Bank of Nigeria since 4 June 2014.

Early life and education
Godwin Emefiele was born in present day Lagos State, Nigeria on 4 August 1961, he is a native of Agbor, Delta State, Nigeria. He attended Ansarudin Primary School and Maryland Comprehensive Secondary both in Lagos, before proceeding to the prestigious University of Nigeria Nsukka (UNN) for his tertiary education. He obtained a Bachelor’s Degree in Banking and Finance, finishing as one of the top students in his class, in 1984. Soon after his National Youth Service, he returned to UNN for a Masters Degree in Finance, which he obtained in 1986. He is also an alumnus of Executive Education at Stanford University, Harvard University (2004) and Wharton School of Business (2005). He was conferred with an Honorary Doctorate Degree in Business Administration by the University of Nigeria Nsukka (UNN).

Career in the private sector
Early in his career, Emefiele lectured finance and insurance at the University of Nigeria Nsukka, and University of Port Harcourt, respectively. He also had a short stint working for vodafone.

Before moving to the Central Bank, he gained over eighteen years of banking experience. He served as chief executive officer and group managing director of Zenith Bank Plc. He served as deputy managing director of Zenith Bank Plc. from 2001. He served as executive director in charge of corporate banking, treasury, financial control and strategic planning of Zenith Bank Plc and served on the management team from its inception. He served as director at Zenith Bank Plc and Zenith Bank (Gambia) Limited. He serves as director of ACCION Microfinance Bank Limited.

Governor of the Central Bank
Emefiele has been governor of the Central Bank of Nigeria since 2014. During his first term, he supervised an interventionist currency policy at the behest of the presidency, propping up the Nigerian Naira by pumping billions of dollars into the foreign exchange market. He also introduced a multiple exchange rate regime to try to mask pressure on the Naira and avoid a series of devaluations.

In 2019, Nigeria's Senate approved a second five-year term for Emefiele. This is the first time that anyone will serve for a second term since Nigeria's return to democracy in 1999. Senator Bukola Saraki read President Buhari's letter on Thursday, 9 May 2019. He was screened on Wednesday and his confirmation came on Thursday, 16 May 2019.

Controversy
In an unprecedented move by any chief of the Nigerian apex bank, Godwin Emefiele ventured into partisan politics against the dictates of the Central Bank Act which provides that the occupant of the governor's position must remain apolitical and independent at all times to preserve the nonpartisan posture of the bank. 

In May 2022, Emefiele drew public outrage when it emerged that he was seeking to replace President Muhammadu Buhari in the 2023 presidential election. What started as a rumor when campaign posters of the bank chief flooded the capital city of Abuja soon gained breath when a group of alleged rice farmers purchased the presidential form of the All Progressive Congress for the CBN Governor. In a series of tweets via his verified account, Emefiele rejected the presidential form and declared he has no intention to contest. But in a quick twist, Emefiele filed a lawsuit at the Federal High Court in Abuja seeking an order from the court directing the electoral body and the office of the attorney general not to stop him from contesting the presidential position. The court stepped down the request but invited the duo to make a formal presentation on why Emefiele's request should not be granted.

Nigerians and the Civil Society Organisations have filed multiple cases in court demanding the removal of the CBN Governor and accusing him of violating multiple provisions of the Central Bank Act.

Other activities
 International Monetary Fund (IMF), Ex-Officio Member of the Board of Governors (since 2018)
 International Islamic Liquidity Management Corporation (IILM), Member of the Governing Board (since 2018)

External links 

 Godwin Emefiele Official Website

See also

References

1961 births
Living people
Governors of the Central Bank of Nigeria
Nigerian bankers
Residents of Lagos
University of Nigeria alumni